Zbigniew Smółka (born 12 May 1972) is a Polish football manager and former player, currently in charge of Moto-Jelcz Oława. Besides Poland, he has managed in Cyprus.

References

1972 births
Living people
Polish footballers
Association football goalkeepers
Chrobry Głogów players
Polar Wrocław players
Odra Opole players
I liga players
Polish football managers
Odra Opole managers
Zawisza Bydgoszcz managers
Stal Mielec managers
Arka Gdynia managers
Widzew Łódź managers
Olimpia Grudziądz managers
Ekstraklasa managers
I liga managers
II liga managers
Sportspeople from Wrocław